Tolchester is a census-designated place in Kent County, Maryland, United States. Its population was 329 as of the 2010 census. The CDP covers the unincorporated community commonly known as Tolchester Beach.

Demographics

References

Census-designated places in Kent County, Maryland
Census-designated places in Maryland